Matthew Sharpe may refer to:
 Matthew Sharpe (writer), American novelist and short story writer
 Matthew Sharpe (British Army officer),  Scottish politician and British Army officer
 Matthew Sharpe (triathlete), Canadian triathlete

See also
 Matt Sharp, American songwriter and musician